Athurmodes is a monotypic moth genus of the family Erebidae. Its only species, Athurmodes spreta, is known from Colombia. Both the genus and the species were first described by Paul Dognin in 1914.

References

Hypeninae
Monotypic moth genera